Ceratocapsus is a genus of plant bugs in the family Miridae. There are more than 130 described species in Ceratocapsus.

See also
 List of Ceratocapsus species

References

Further reading

External links

 

Miridae genera
Articles created by Qbugbot
Ceratocapsini